was a railway station on the Iwaizumi Line in Miyako, Japan, operated by East Japan Railway Company (JR East).

Lines
Oshikado Station was a station on the Iwaizumi Line, and was located 15.8 rail kilometers from the opposing terminus of the line at Moichi Station.

Station layout
Oshikado Station had a single side platform serving traffic in both directions. The station was unattended.

History
Oshikado Station opened on 20 July 1944. The station was absorbed into the JR East network upon the privatization of the Japanese National Railways (JNR) on 1 April 1987.  The operation of the Iwaizumi Line was suspended in July 2010 and the line was officially closed on 1 April 2014.

Surrounding area
The station is located in an isolated rural area surrounded by mountains and forests. There are no stores or houses in the vicinity.

References

Railway stations in Japan opened in 1944
Railway stations in Iwate Prefecture
Iwaizumi Line
Defunct railway stations in Japan
Railway stations closed in 2014